Queen Anne can refer to:

Related to Queen Anne, queen-regnant of Great Britain
 Anne, Queen of Great Britain (1665–1714), queen of England and Scotland (1702–1707), Ireland (1702–1714) and of Great Britain (1707–1714)
Queen Anne style architecture, an architectural style from her reign, and its revivals
Queen Anne style furniture
Queen Anne (play), a 2015 play on Anne's life
Queen Anne's War during her reign
MS Queen Anne Ship named after the Monarch

Other queens called Anne, Ann or Anna
Anne of Kiev (c. 1024–1075), queen of France
Anne of Bohemia (1290–1313), queen of Bohemia
Anne of Bohemia (1366–1394), queen of England
Anne Neville (1456–1485), queen of England
Anne of Brittany (1477–1514), queen of France
Anne of Foix-Candale (1484–1506), queen of Hungary and Bohemia
Anne Boleyn (1501/7–1536), queen of England
Anne of Bohemia and Hungary (1503–1547), queen of Hungary, Germany and Bohemia
Anne of Cleves (1515–1557), queen of England
Anna Jagiellon (1523–1596), queen of Poland
Anna of Austria, Queen of Spain (1549–1580), queen of Spain and Portugal
Anne of Austria, Queen of Poland (1573–1598), queen of Poland and Sweden
Anne of Denmark (1574–1619), queen of Scotland and England
Anne Catherine of Brandenburg (1575–1612), queen of Denmark and Norway
Anna of Tyrol (1585–1618), queen of Germany, Hungary and Bohemia
Anne of Austria (1601–1666), queen of France
Queen Ann (Pamunkey chief) (c. 1650–c. 1725), Native American tribal leader in colonial Virginia
Maria Anna of Neuburg (1667–1740), queen of Spain
Anna of Russia (1730–1740), empress of Russia 
Maria Anna of Austria (1683–1754), queen of Portugal
Anne Sophie Reventlow (1693–1743), queen of Denmark and Norway
Anna Pavlovna of Russia (1795–1865), queen of the Netherlands
Maria Anna of Savoy (1803–1884), queen of Hungary
Anne of Bourbon-Parma (1923–2016), titular queen of Romania
Anne-Marie of Denmark (born 1946), queen of the Hellenes
Queen Anna of Arendelle, a name given to Anna at the end of the 2019 Disney film Frozen II

Places
Queen Anne, Maryland, USA; on Maryland's Eastern Shore
Queen Anne, Prince George's County, Maryland, USA; census-designated place on the Patuxent River
Queen Anne's County, Maryland, USA
Queen Anne, Seattle, Washington, USA

See also

 
Queen Anne-Marie of Greece (born 1946), queen of Greece
Keran, Queen of Armenia (before 1262–1285)
Queen Anne style (disambiguation)
Ann Regina (disambiguation) ; latin for "Ann the Queen"; including Anne, Anna, Ana
Princess Anne (disambiguation)
Anne (disambiguation)